Sir John Watson Gordon  (1788 – 1 June 1864) was a Scottish portrait painter and president of the Royal Scottish Academy.

Life and work
Gordon was born John Watson in Edinburgh, the eldest son of Captain Watson, R.A., a cadet of the family of Watson of Overmains, in the county of Berwick. He was educated specifically to prepare him for enrolling in the Royal Engineers. He entered as a student in the government school of design, under the management of the Board of Manufactures. he showed a natural aptitude for art, and his father was persuaded to allow him to adopt it as his profession. Captain Watson was himself a skilful draughtsman, and his brother George Watson, afterwards president of the Royal Scottish Academy, was a highly respected portrait painter, second only to Sir Henry Raeburn, who was a friend of the family.

In 1808 Gordon exhibited a picture "The Lay of the Last Minstrel" at the Lyceum in Nicolson Street, Edinburgh – the first public exhibition of paintings in that city – and continued for some years to exhibit fancy subjects; but, although freely and sweetly painted, they were altogether without the force and character which stamped his portrait pictures as the works of a master. After the death of Sir Henry Raeburn in 1823 he succeeded to much of his practice. He assumed the name of Gordon in 1826.

One of the earliest of his famous sitters was Sir Walter Scott, who sat for a first portrait in 1820. Then came JG Lockhart in 1821; Professor Wilson, 1822 and 1850, two portraits; Sir Archibald Alison, 1839; Dr Chalmers, 1844; a little later De Quincey, and Sir David Brewster, 1864. Among his most important works may be mentioned the 1st Marquess of Dalhousie; Sir Alexander Hope (1835); Lord President Hope; and Dr Chalmers. These, unlike his later works, are generally rich in colour. The full-length of Dr Alexander Brunton (1844), and Dr Lee, the principal of the university (1846), mark a modification of his style, which ultimately resolved itself into extreme simplicity, both of colour and treatment.

During the last twenty years of his life he painted many distinguished Englishmen who came to Edinburgh to sit to him. And it is significant that David Cox, the landscape painter, on being presented with his portrait, subscribed for by many friends, chose to go to Edinburgh to have it executed by Watson Gordon, although he neither knew the painter personally nor had ever before visited the country. Among the portraits painted during this period, in what may be termed his third style, are De Quincey; General Sir Thomas Macdougall Brisbane; the Prince of Wales, Lord Macaulay, Sir M. Packington, Lord Murray, Lord Cockburn, Lord Rutherfurd and Sir John Shaw-Lefevre.

These latter pictures are mostly clear and grey, sometimes showing little or no positive colour, the flesh itself being very grey, and the handling extremely masterly, though never obtruding its cleverness. He was very successful in rendering acute observant character. A good example of his last style, showing pearly flesh-painting freely handled, yet highly finished, is his head of Sir John Shaw-Lefevre.

Gordon was one of the earlier members of the Royal Scottish Academy, and was elected its president in 1850; he was at the same time appointed limner for Scotland to the queen, and received the honour of knighthood. Since 1841 he had been an associate of the Royal Academy, and in 1851 he was elected a royal academician.

He is buried in the eastern extension of Canongate Kirkyard on the Royal Mile in Edinburgh.

Notes

References

Further reading

 Watson Gordon, John in: Thieme-Becker

External links

 
 Sir John Watson-Gordon (The Walter Scott Digital Archive)
 Works in the National Galleries of Scotland
 John Watson Gordononline (Artcyclopedia)
 The Prince of Wales (King Edward VII) by Sir John Watson Gordon / Smithsonian American Art Museum
 Profile on Royal Academy of Arts Collections

1788 births
1864 deaths
19th-century Scottish painters
Scottish male painters
Scottish portrait painters
Burials at the Canongate Kirkyard
Royal Scottish Academicians
Artists from Edinburgh
Alumni of the Edinburgh College of Art
Royal Academicians
19th-century Scottish male artists